Andrew Forsyth (born 9 September 1990) is a retired English rugby union footballer, from Clayton West, Huddersfield, United Kingdom.

Education and career 
He attended Queen Elizabeth Grammar School, Wakefield. He plays as both a centre and fullback. He has represented England at both Under-16, Under-18 and Under-20 level and played for Leicester Tigers as part of their rugby academy squad. He is one of the brightest young rugby talents in the United Kingdom, despite being diabetic.

Forsyth made his first team debut for Tigers from the bench against Northampton Saints in October 2009. He started at centre in the game against  in November 2009.

After stints at Sale and Yorkshire Carnegie, Forsyth signed for Coventry. The Championship club confirmed he would be loaned to Leicester as cover during the 2019 Rugby World Cup.

However after not fulfilling his potential he now works at Abaco Insurance Brokers as an Account Executive.

References

External links
Tigers profile

1990 births
Living people
English rugby union players
Leeds Tykes players
Leicester Tigers players
Nottingham R.F.C. players
Rugby union centres
Rugby union fullbacks
Rugby union players from Yorkshire